Fernando Enrique Carrillo Roselli (born January 6, 1970, in Caracas, Venezuela) is a Venezuelan actor, model and singer.

Biography 
Fernando Enrique Carrillo Roselli was born on January 6, 1970, in Caracas, Venezuela. He was mostly educated in London. He graduated from the Central University of Venezuela.

Career 
Fernando is most known for his telenovelas, such as María Isabel and his most popular, Rosalinda starring with Mexican superstar Thalía. Carrillo was part of a music band in Venezuela along with 2 siblings. In December 2012, he revisited the Philippines. He was interviewed by Korina Sanchez during her radio show on DZMM and Boy Abunda on The Buzz.

Personal life 
On 1990, he married the actress, Catherine Fulop. The couple divorced in 1994.

He has a son named Ángel Gabriel Carrillo who was born in November 2008.

He resides in Tulum, Mexico.

In 2020, he married Maria Gabriela Rodriguez, an illustrator from Colombia. In 2022 the couple had a son named Milo Carillo Rodriguez. The couple reside in Mexico.

Filmography

Television

Theater

Movies

Television programs 

|}

Discography

Singles

As lead artist
 1990 — Desde aquí
 1998 — Algún día
 2000 — Fernando in Manila

References

External links 
  (contains Flash)
 

1970 births
Living people
Venezuelan expatriates in Mexico
Venezuelan male telenovela actors
Venezuelan people of Italian descent
Venezuelan Roman Catholics
Male actors from Caracas
20th-century Venezuelan male singers
21st-century Venezuelan male singers
20th-century Venezuelan male actors
21st-century Venezuelan male actors
Participants in Argentine reality television series
Bailando por un Sueño (Argentine TV series) participants